Tim Lagasse (born 1968/1969) is an American director, puppeteer and puppet designer. He has worked on films and television programs for Sesame Workshop, Nickelodeon, Disney XD, and HBO. He is known for playing the title character on Noggin's Oobi, and Crash on Disney XD's Crash & Bernstein.

Lagasse has been nominated for three Daytime Emmy Awards. In 1991, he became the first recipient of the Jim Henson Memorial Prize in Puppetry. In 1993 he was presented with a Citation for Excellence by UNIMA; and later that year, received a Broadcast Design Silver Award for his series of short films, A Show of Hands.

Biography 
Lagasse was born in Milford, Connecticut. He attended St. Mary's School and Notre Dame High School in West Haven, and graduated from the University of Connecticut in 1992 with a BFA in Puppet Arts.

One of his earliest roles was Mr. Cook on the Nickelodeon series Allegra's Window. He also played the title character on the Noggin's Oobi series, and Crash on Disney XD's Crash & Bernstein. He has performed additional characters on Sesame Street, The Muppets and the 2008 film A Muppets Christmas: Letters to Santa. In addition to his performance credits, he has built puppets for The Jim Henson Company and Puppet Heap.

Lagasse also teaches the art of puppetry, lecturing at the Lincoln Center Foundation and instructing students on modern puppetry techniques at the University of Connecticut's Puppet Arts Program. In 2011 he offered workshops on building puppets at the University of Central Arkansas as part of Heather Henson's Handmade Puppet Dreams Film Festival. In 2012 he traveled to Haiti with No Strings Productions as a puppet workshop trainer.

Filmography

Awards and nominations

References

External links 
 Official website
 

American puppeteers
Muppet performers
Sesame Street Muppeteers
Living people
1969 births